Jerrawangala is a locality in the City of Shoalhaven in New South Wales, Australia. It consists of a small settlement on the Princes Highway south of Nowra and a large unpopulated area to the northwest that lies on both sides of the Braidwood Road between Nowra and Nerriga. It is about 35 kilometres south of Nowra and about 205 km south of Sydney. Jerrawangala is fairly rugged sandstone country and largely consists of forest. Much of it lies within the Jerrawangala National Park or state forests. Jerrawangala lookout is located to the east of the Braidwood Road.

Part of the Braidwood Road through Jerrawangala, part of the access road to Jerrawangala lookout, and the modern-day Wandean Road were built originally as part of The Wool Road in 1841.

References

City of Shoalhaven
Localities in New South Wales